"Be Still" is the first single by Yolanda Adams from her eleventh studio album Becoming being released with N-House Music Group. The song was produced by Texas native, Donald "Drathoven" Atkins, Jr., a R&B, Gospel, and Rap producer.

The song initially surfaced on her Radio Show on April 19, 2011, and became available for download off her official website.  A concept video for Be Still will make its worldwide debut on January 31, 2012.

Music video
The music video for "Be Still" was released January 31, 2012 on her official website. It was directed by Chris L. It shows Yolanda going through a busy day with the morning show, interviews, and the clothing line. The end of the video ends with her spending time with her daughter.

Chart positions

References

2011 songs
2011 singles
Yolanda Adams songs
Songs written by Yolanda Adams